Antti Vilho Olavi Litja (21 February 1938 – 13 July 2022) was a Finnish actor.

Litja made over 60 film and television appearances since 1959. A prominent figure in Finnish film in the 1970s and 1980s, since the mid-1990s he mostly appeared on television.

Litja played the main character in the 1977 film The Year of the Hare about a Finnish man from Helsinki who leaves to find a new life in the wilderness.

Selected filmography
 The Year of the Hare (1977)
 Wonderman (1979)
 That Kiljunen Family (1981)
 The Clan – Tale of the Frogs (1984)
 Farewell, Mr. President (1987)
 The Glory and Misery of Human Life (1988)
 Princess (2010)
 The Grump (2014)

References

External links

1938 births
2022 deaths
People from Kamennogorsk
Finnish male film actors
Finnish male television actors
20th-century Finnish male actors
21st-century Finnish male actors